Barassie railway station is a railway station serving Barassie, South Ayrshire, Scotland. The station is managed by ScotRail and is on the Ayrshire Coast Line.

History 

The station was originally opened on 5 August 1839 by the Glasgow, Paisley, Kilmarnock and Ayr Railway. At one point a halt existed nearby serving Barassie Workshops, however it was closed by July 1926.

These  platforms went out of use after the local passenger service over the branch was withdrawn by British Rail on 3 March 1969. They are now derelict & fenced off, but the two platforms on the Ayr line are still operational today. Barassie was a staffed station until the line was electrified in 1986, but the main buildings have since been demolished and there are now only waiting shelters in use on each platform.

South of the station, there are a number of active engineers sidings that occupy the alignment of the original 1839 GPK&AR route southwards. It wasn't until 1892 that this problem was finally remedied by the Glasgow and South Western Railway, who opened a new deviation line and passenger station that was much better sited for the town. This line (known as the Troon Loop) is now the only one in use, as its predecessor closed to through traffic in November 1982 (though most passenger trains had been routed via the Loop line since April 1966) and was subsequently lifted at its southern end during the re-signalling & electrification work. The former K&TR line to  has also disappeared, closing to all traffic in 1973.

Passenger services over the Kilmarnock branch were subsequently reinstated in May 1975, when the twice-daily  - London Euston boat trains were diverted over the route.  However the branch platforms were not reopened (as noted above) as the services concerned ran non-stop between Kilmarnock & Ayr.  As a consequence of this, the current (more frequent) Kilmarnock - Ayr -  DMU service cannot call here.  The branch has also been singled, with control shared between the West of Scotland Signalling Centre in Glasgow (which supervises the entire Glasgow - Ayr route) and Kilmarnock PSB.

Services 2022

December 2022
There are now four departures per hour to Glasgow Central & Ayr on weekdays as well as Saturdays. The evening & Sunday service remains unchanged.

References

Notes

Sources

External links

Video footage of Barassie Junction and Station
Railscot - Barassie
Canmore Site Record for Barassie Station

Railway stations in South Ayrshire
Railway stations in Great Britain opened in 1839
Railway stations served by ScotRail
SPT railway stations
Former Glasgow and South Western Railway stations
Troon